R. Subbanna (21 September 1911 – 9 April 1977) was the first Mayor of Bangalore city of Karnataka, India.

Mayor of Bangalore
Municipality Corporation in Bangalore was formed in the year 1949. R. Subbanna was the first nominated mayor of Bangalore in the same year 1949. His term lasted for just a year. The first municipal election was conducted in 1950, the next year.

Background 
Subbana was a congress volunteer and served the State Congress of Bangalore for 30 years.

References

Mayors of Bangalore
Indian National Congress politicians from Karnataka